James Shaw (8 August 1904 – after 1930) was an English professional footballer who played as an inside forward. He scored 4 goals in 11 appearances in the Football League playing for Arsenal.

Playing career
Shaw was born in Goldenhill, Staffordshire and began his football career with Bolton then moved to Frickley Colliery in the Midland League, before turning professional with Arsenal. He spent four seasons with Arsenal before moving to Brentford in 1930 where he only made limited first team appearances before joining Gillingham in 1931, where he made 10 first team appearances.

References

External links
Official Frickley Athletic museum and hall of fame website

English footballers
Association football forwards
Frickley Athletic F.C. players
Arsenal F.C. players
Gillingham F.C. players
Brentford F.C. players
English Football League players
Year of death missing
Place of death missing
1904 births
Bolton Wanderers F.C. players
People from Goldenhill